This is a list of television programs formerly or currently broadcast by TLC.

Current programming

First-run original programming

Re-runs of acquired programming

Former programming

Original programming

 Ready Set Learn

Acquired programming

 Amazing Space
 Bling It On
 Beakman's World (1992–95)
 The Boy With a Tumor for a Face
 Breaking the Faith
 Brides of Beverly Hills
 Bringing Home Baby
 The Busey Bunch
 Biba's Italian Kitchen
 Bob Vila's Home Again
 Cash Cab
 Carlo Cooks Italian
 Caprial's Cafe
 Cover Shot
 Dancing Tweens
 Death by Chocolate
 The Day the Universe Changed
 Escaping the Prophet
 Everyday Exotic
 Extreme Machines
 Fabulous Cakes
 Furniture on the Mend
 Furniture to Go
 Fast Food Babies
 Firefight: Stories From The Frontlines
 Former Smokers
 Four Weddings
 Great Castles of Europe
 Hands on Crafts
 Home Made Simple
 Home Savvy
 The Home Pro
 Hometime
 Honey, We're Killing the Kids
 I am the Elephant Man
 I Didn't Know I Was Pregnant
 I Eat 33,000 Calories a Day
 Kennedy Home Movies
 The Lottery Changed My Life
 Making Over America
 Man Versus Food
 Master of Dance
 Middle Eastern Café
 Million Dollar Agents
 Miss America Pageant
 My Crazy Obsession
 My Unique Family
 Mysteries of the ER
 The Operation
 Outrageous Kid Parties
 Plain Jane
 Property Ladder
 Psychic Witness
 Rags to Red Carpet
 The Renovation Guide
 She Does Not Feel Pain
 Shopaholic Showdown
 Surprise Homecoming
 Surviving Motherhood
 Ted Haggard: Scandalous
 Trading Spouses
 The Ultimate Guide
 Undercover Boss
 Traveling Family Features: The Adrids
War and Civilization
Wedding Dress Wars
Weird Worlds
What the Sell?
Wild Weddings

Children's programming
From December 28, 1992 to September 26, 2008, TLC ran a children's programming block, Ready Set Learn. It ran from 6:00am – 12:00pm Eastern Time until 2000, when it was shortened to 6:00am – 9:00am. On February 24, 2003, Ready Set Learn received a major rebrand hosted by Paz the penguin. The Ready Set Learn branding was also used for Discovery Kids' preschool programming. As leadup to the relaunch of Discovery Kids as the Hub Network on October 10, 2010 (which would in turn be rebranded as the Discovery Family Channel on October 13, 2014), Family Game Night, one of the new programs featured on the relaunched network, was aired on October 10, 2010.

Animal Jam (2003–04)
Balamory (2005–06)
The Berenstain Bears (1998–99)
The Big Garage (1997–2001)
Bigfoot Presents: Meteor and the Mighty Monster Trucks (2006–08)
Bindi the Jungle Girl (2008)
Bingo and Molly (1997–2002)
Bookmice (1992–96)
Brum (2003–04)
Chicken Minute (1995–97)
Hi-5 (2003–08)
Hip Hop Harry (2006–08)
Iris, The Happy Professor (1992–97)
Jay Jay the Jet Plane (1998–2000)
Join In! (1992–95)
Kitty Cats (1992–97)
Little Star (1995–97)
Madison's Adventures Growing Up Wild (1996–98)
The Magic Box (1992–96)
The Magic School Bus (2003–08)
Nini's Treehouse (2000–2003)
Pappyland (1996–2003)
The Paz Show (2003–08)
Peep and the Big Wide World (2004–08)
Ready Set Learn Short Stuff (1992–2003)
Rory and Me (1994–97)
Rory's Place (1996–2000)
Salty's Lighthouse (1998–2002)
The Save-Ums! (2003–06)
Skinnamarink TV (1997–2003)
The Swamp Critters of Lost Lagoon (1997–98)
Timothy Goes to School (2004–06)
ToddWorld (2004–07)
Wilbur (2007–08)
Wisdom of the Gnomes (1996–98)
The World of David the Gnome (1996–98)
Zoobilee Zoo (1992–95)

Notes

References

TLC